The Unknown Cavalier is a 1926 American silent Western film directed by Albert S. Rogell and starring Ken Maynard, Kathleen Collins and David Torrence. It is based on the 1923 novel Ride Him, Cowboy by Kenneth Perkins.

Cast
 Ken Maynard as Tom Drury 
 Kathleen Collins as Ruth Gaunt 
 David Torrence as Peter Gaunt 
 T. Roy Barnes as Clout Pettingill 
 Jim Mason as Henry Suggs 
 Otis Harlan as Judge Blowfly Jones 
 Josef Swickard as Lingo 
 Bruce Gordon as Bob Webb 
 Fred Burns as Sheriff 
 Jimmy Boudwin as Billy Gaunt 
 Pat Harmon as Bad Man 
 Frank Lackteen as Bad Man 
 Raymond Wells as Bad Man

References

Bibliography
 Darby, William. Masters of Lens and Light: A Checklist of Major Cinematographers and Their Feature Films. Scarecrow Press, 1991.

External links
 

1926 films
1926 Western (genre) films
Films directed by Albert S. Rogell
1920s English-language films
First National Pictures films
American black-and-white films
Silent American Western (genre) films
1920s American films